Kirkwood Township is one of the sixteen townships of Belmont County, Ohio, United States. The 2010 census found 400 people in the township.

Geography
Located in the western part of the county, it borders the following townships:
Flushing Township - north
Union Township - east
Goshen Township - southeast
Warren Township - south
Oxford Township, Guernsey County - southwest
Londonderry Township, Guernsey County - northwest

Part of the village of Fairview is located in southwestern Kirkwood Township.

The Egypt Valley Wildlife Area comprises a significant portion of the township.

Name and history
Kirkwood Township was named for Robert Kirkwood, a soldier who fought in the American Revolutionary War.  It is the only Kirkwood Township statewide.

Government
The township is governed by a three-member board of trustees, who are elected in November of odd-numbered years to a four-year term beginning on the following January 1. Two are elected in the year after the presidential election and one is elected in the year before it. There is also an elected township fiscal officer, who serves a four-year term beginning on April 1 of the year after the election, which is held in November of the year before the presidential election. Vacancies in the fiscal officership or on the board of trustees are filled by the remaining trustees.

References

External links
County website

Townships in Belmont County, Ohio
Townships in Ohio